This article lists footballers who currently are or have previously played for Peruvian football (soccer) team Sport Huancayo.

List of players

Current squad

References

Lists of association football players by club
Sport Huancayo